Unonopsis is a genus of plant in family Annonaceae. It contains the following species (this list may be incomplete):
 Unonopsis floribunda, Diels
 Unonopsis magnifolia, R.E. Fr.
 Unonopsis velutina, P. Maas

Annonaceae
Annonaceae genera
Taxonomy articles created by Polbot